Orontobia secreta is a moth of the family Erebidae. It was described by Max Wilhelm Karl Draudt in 1931. It is found in China (northern Gansu, Qinghai) and Tibet.

Subspecies
Orontobia secreta secreta (China: northern Gansu, Qinghai)
Orontobia secreta dalailama de Freina, 1997 (Tibet)

References

Arctiina
Moths described in 1931